Club Atlético Arteixo is a Spanish football team based in Arteixo, A Coruña, in the autonomous community of Galicia. Founded in 1949 it currently plays in Tercera División RFEF, holding home games at Campo Municipal Ponte dos Brozos, with a capacity of 2,000 spectators.

In 2004–05, after four seasons in Tercera División and 51 in the regional leagues, Atlético Arteixo played in Segunda División B, after beating Real Oviedo in the last round of the 2003–04 promotion playoffs. At the end of the season, in which it ranked last, the club was relegated two divisions, to Preferente Grupo Norte – Galicia, due to unpaid wages to players.

Season to season

1 season in Segunda División B
4 seasons in Tercera División

Notable former players
 Javier Manjarín
 Nando

External links
Official website 
BDFútbol team profile

Football clubs in Galicia (Spain)
Divisiones Regionales de Fútbol clubs
Association football clubs established in 1949
1949 establishments in Spain